Oleksandr Lysenko (born 16 February 1956, in Hrebinka) is a former Soviet football player and currently a Ukrainian football coach.

References

External links
 Moskalenko, D. 30 best footballers in a history of Dnipro. Dnipro city portal "Vgorode". 24 May 2011

1956 births
Living people
People from Hrebinka
Ukrainian football managers
Ukrainian Premier League managers
FC Dnipro managers
FC Kryvbas Kryvyi Rih managers
FC Metalurh Novomoskovsk managers
FC Dnipro-3 Dnipropetrovsk managers
FC Dnipro-2 Dnipropetrovsk managers
FC Elektrometalurh Nikopol managers
FC Metalist Kharkiv players
FC Dnipro players
Soviet Top League players
Soviet footballers
Association football midfielders
Sportspeople from Poltava Oblast